Horpit is an agricultural hamlet in the parish of Wanborough in the north-eastern corner of Wiltshire county, England.

Horpit lies in the clay vale to the northwest of the Marlborough Downs.

Hamlets in Wiltshire